Rafaela "Rafa" Medina Ancheta (born 2 January 1997) is a Brazilian-born Uruguayan footballer who plays as a centre-back for Real Brasília and the Uruguay women's national team.

Early life
Rafa Ancheta was born in Porto Alegre to Alfonso Medina and Gabriela Ancheta. She has a brother, Rodrigo, who is also a footballer.

International career
Rafa Ancheta made her formal debut for Uruguay on 4 March 2019 in a 0–6 friendly loss against France.

Personal life
Rafa Ancheta is the granddaughter of former Uruguayan international footballer Atilio Ancheta.

References 

1997 births
Living people
People with acquired Uruguayan citizenship
Uruguayan women's footballers
Women's association football central defenders
Women's association football fullbacks
Women's association football midfielders
UD Granadilla Tenerife players
Uruguay women's international footballers
Uruguayan expatriate women's footballers
Uruguayan expatriate sportspeople in Spain
Expatriate women's footballers in Spain
Footballers from Porto Alegre
Brazilian women's footballers
Grêmio Foot-Ball Porto Alegrense players
Brazilian people of Uruguayan descent
Sportspeople of Uruguayan descent
Brazilian expatriate women's footballers
Brazilian expatriate sportspeople in Spain